Vavuniya Airport  is an air force base and domestic airport in Vavuniya in northern Sri Lanka. Originally built by the Royal Air Force during World War II, it was taken over by the Sri Lanka Air Force in 1978.

History
During World War II the British Royal Air Force built an airfield in Vavuniya in northern Ceylon. A number of RAF squadrons (17, 22, 47, 60, 89, 132, 176, 217) and other units were stationed at the airfield during and immediately after the war. The airfield was also used by the Fleet Air Arm.

A Sri Lanka Air Force detachment moved onto the site on 1 August 1978. The airfield become one of the air force's air bases. The airport is part of a large military complex in Vavuniya that includes Security Forces Headquarters - Wanni.

Airlines and destinations

Lodger squadrons
 No. 111 Air Surveillance Squadron
 No. 02 Air Defence Radar Squadron

References

External links
 

Airports in Sri Lanka
Buildings and structures in Vavuniya
Military installations in Northern Province, Sri Lanka
Sri Lanka Air Force bases
Transport buildings and structures in Vavuniya District
World War II sites in Sri Lanka